Korean melodrama refers to a subgenre of melodrama, which drew largely on native Korean narrative and theatrical forms through adaptations of traditional folk tales and pansori. This genre also drew its influences from Japanese theatrical "shimpa" and early Hollywood films.

The term melodrama originally stems from the Greek word melos, meaning music. However, in contemporary Korean melodramas, minimal music has replaced the typical throbbing and seductive tunes. Fifty to seventy percent of films produced in Korea and classified as melodramas and they typically portray the neglected corners of society and its exaggerated feelings and circumstances work to arouse empathy in the viewer.

Korean vs. Western 
In contrast to Western Melodrama, the concept of suffering is a fundamental component. It is partly captured in the word han, which is a deep-seated feeling of sorrow, bitterness, or despair that originates in oppression or injustice which accumulates over time and remains unexpressed in the heart. It is believed by some to be a distinguishing characteristic of the Korean culture. Another distinguishing characteristic of Korean melodrama is the emphasis on family. While Western Melodrama tends to focus on the individual, the portrayal of the self in relation to the family in Korean Melodrama is significant.  Early melodramatic texts typically dramatize the moral superiority of old values.

In American melodramas, restages of social and cultural values are also pivotal. However, there is more of a tendency to evaluate the rapid transformation of social relations by looking back and consulting the old order of things. In typical endings, characters whose world has collapsed around them usually find another form of personal satisfaction and re-invest their faith in the typical American dream: a classic Hollywood happy ending. Contrast this to Korean melodramas, where the main characters don't recover. When Korean melodrama characters realize they've lost it all, the film usually takes them back to a fleeting memory of past happiness and then ends, eschewing resolution.

History 
Melodrama in Korea has been a dominant genre in the film industry since 1919. With early influences stemming from the Japanese theatrical shimpa (adapted from western melodrama), traditional folk tales such as pansori (an oral narrative poetry expressed in song) and Hollywood, Korean melodrama evolved from the 1920s up until the twenty first century.

Timeline 
 1910-45: Japanese colonialism subjected Koreans to violence, humiliation, and mass displacements. However, the Japanese simultaneously introduced shimpa. This new form of theater became widespread by the 1920s and greatly influenced Korean melodrama. Plots commonly revolving around heterosexual love, class differences, social change, and triumphing protagonists were central in both Japanese and Korean melodramas.
 1950s: Hollywood films entered the Korean Film industry when the U.S. occupied Korea after World War II. There was a Korean Cinema boom and melodramas became very popular. During this time melodramas focused either on modernization or the issue of "free love"
 1960s: Melodramas reached the peak of their popularity and focused on social issues such as highlighting economic struggles and class differences that divided society. Student uprisings were frequent and more grassroots protests for political and economic justice were prevalent which influenced the narration of Korean melodramas.
 1970s: Melodramas reached its low point for the film industry. Melodramas focused on the mood of the society in general, revolving around women who served alcohol or worked as prostitutes
 1980s: After a relaxation of censorship, melodramas depicted contemporary issues such as Korea's rapid development and the effects this had on the poor.
 1990s: Melodramas tended to focus on romantic comedies and action pictures. Also a new concept of melodrama began to form. In 1998, Christmas in August redefined Korean melodrama.

Central features in Korean melodrama 
According to "Melodrama Revised," by Linda Williams, melodramas typically portrays five aspects.
 Melodrama begins, and wants to end, in a space of innocence
 Melodrama focuses on victim-heroes and the recognition of their virtue
 Melodrama appears modern by borrowing from realism, but realism serves the melodramatic passion and action
 Melodrama involves a dialectic of passion and action – a give and take of “too late” and “in the nick of time”
 Melodrama presents characters who embody primary psychic roles organized in Manichaean conflicts between good and evil

References
 Contemporary Korean Cinema
 The Korea Society
 South Korean Golden Age, Melodrama
 Genrebending in Contemporary Korean Cinema

External links
 Linda Williams
 Korean Film
 Korean Society
 Tiger Cinema

Film genres
Cinema of Korea